Lim Yoon-sun (born November 17, 1978) is a South Korean television personality and lawyer. She was a cast member in the reality show The Genius: Rule Breaker and The Genius: Grand Final.

References

External links
Official blog

1978 births
Living people
21st-century South Korean lawyers
South Korean television personalities
People from Chungju
Seoul National University alumni
South Korean women lawyers